Ty King-Wall is a New Zealand ballet dancer, and a principal dancer with The Australian Ballet.

Dance career
King-Wall was born in Waihi, New Zealand. He started dancing aged seven and trained at the Dance Education Centre, Tauranga. He was a Junior Associate of The New Zealand School of Dance. He joined The Australian Ballet School at the age of 16 and The Australian Ballet in 2006 becoming soloist in 2010, senior artist in 2011 and principal artist in 2013.
King-Wall won the Telstra Ballet Dancer Award for 2010, jointly with Dana Stephensen.

He is married to Amber Scott, also a principal dancer with the Australian ballet. They have a daughter.

Selected repertoire

 Ceyx in Tim Harbour's Halcyon (2006) (Harbour created the role on King-Wall)
 Prince Florimund in Stanton Welch's The Sleeping Beauty (2009)
 The Prince in Peter Wright's The Nutcracker (2010)
 Lensky in John Cranko's Onegin (2012)
 Prince Siegfried in Stephen Baynes' Swan Lake (2012)
 Principal Man in Harald Lander's Études (2012)
 Basilio in Rudolf Nureyev's Don Quixote (2013)
 Solor in Stanton Welch's La Bayadère (2014)
 Albrecht in Maina Gielgud's Giselle (2015)

Awards

 PACANZ Young Performer of the Year Award, 2002
 Silver Medal, Asia Pacific International Ballet Competition, 2005
 Lissa Black scholarship, 2009
 Telstra Ballet Dancer Award, 2010 (also nominee in 2008)

References

New Zealand male ballet dancers
Australian Ballet senior artists
Living people
Telstra Ballet Dancer Award winners
1980s births
People from Waihi
21st-century New Zealand dancers
21st-century Australian dancers